The Loudspeaker is a 1934 American  comedy film directed by Joseph Santley.

The film is also known as The Radio Star in the United Kingdom.

Plot summary 
Wisecracking Joe Miller (Ray Walker) makes it to the big time in radio.

When he gives his girlfriend Janet (Julie Bishop) her big break, she becomes an even bigger star. He feels like the joke's on him, when she starts going out with his friend George (Lorin Raker); and, he turns to booze, for comfort.

Whether Joe can crawl back up, out of the bottle; or, if Janet, or the sponsors and audience will take him back, remains to be seen.

Cast 
Ray Walker as Joe Miller
Julie Bishop as Janet Melrose
Charley Grapewin as Pop Calloway
Noel Francis as Dolly
Lorin Raker as George Green
Spencer Charters as Burroughs
Larry Wheat as Thomas
Mary Carr as Grandma
Ruth Romaine as Amy Witherspoon
Billy Irvin as Caleb Hawkins
Eddie Kane
Wilbur Mack as Walker
Sherwood Bailey as Ignatz
The Brownies Trio as Vocal Ensemble

Soundtrack 
 Jacqueline Wells (dubbed) - "Who But You" (Written by Harry Akst and Lew Brown)
 Jacqueline Wells (dubbed) - "Doo Ah Doo Ah Know What I'm Doing" (Written by Harry Akst and Lew Brown)

External links 

1934 films
American comedy-drama films
American black-and-white films
Monogram Pictures films
1934 comedy-drama films
Films directed by Joseph Santley
1930s English-language films
1930s American films